The 2022 Blackburn with Darwen Borough Council election took place on 5 May 2022 to elect members of Blackburn with Darwen Borough Council in England. This was on the same day as other local elections. One-third of the seats were up for election.

Results summary

Ward results

Audley & Queen's Park

Bastwell & Daisyfield

Billinge & Beardwood

Blackburn Central

Blackburn South & Lower Darwen

Blackburn South East

Darwen East

Darwen South

Darwen West

Ewood

Little Harwood & Whitebirk

Livesey with Pleasington

Mill Hill & Moorgate

Roe Lee

Shear Brow & Corporation Park

Wensley Fold

West Pennine

References

Blackburn with Darwen
Blackburn with Darwen Borough Council elections